Francisco Palmeiro Rodrigues (26 July 1914 – date of death unknown) was a Portuguese footballer who played as a forward.

Career
Rodrigues played for Benfica between 1939 and 1942, and moved to Vitória de Setúbal where he won two Bota de Prata awards (league top scorer), becoming the first player to win it two straight outright times. While at Benfica, he scored 9 goals against city rivals, Sporting CP.

References

External links

1914 births
Portuguese footballers
Association football forwards
Vitória F.C. players
S.L. Benfica footballers
Primeira Liga players
Year of death missing